Peloncillo Mountains may refer to:

 Peloncillo Mountains (Hidalgo County)
 Peloncillo Mountains (Cochise County)